The 2012–13 FA Women's Premier League Cup is the 23rd edition of the cup tournament for teams both levels of the Women's Premier League, the National Division and the Northern and Southern Divisions. Thirty teams were initially drawn into six groups (six groups of five teams) with the first games of the season being played on September 9, 2012.

Group stage
The draw was held at Wembley Stadium in early August 2012. Six groups of five teams were drawn. Rochdale in group 4 withdraw before playing a match. The teams finishing winners and runners-up of each group, along with the best four third-placed teams (based on the highest number of points, superior goal difference, higher number of goals scored in these matches, drawing of lots) progressed.

Group 1

Group 2

Group 3

Group 4

Group 5

Group 6

Knock-out stage
Drawn early December 2012.

Last 16

Source: FA WPL: Matches

Quarter finals

Source: FA WPL: Matches

Semi finals

Source: FA WPL: Matches

Final
Aston Villa won on penalties.

References

External links
Results at fulltime-league.thefa.com

FA Women's National League Cup
Prem